Louis Andrew Riley (7 September 1909 – 20 April 1989) was an Australian rules footballer who played for Melbourne and Collingwood in the Victorian Football League (VFL) during the 1930s.

The youngest son of Alexander Riley (1873–1911) and Emily Caroline Riley, née Hele (1874–1963), Louis Andrew Riley was born at Granville, New South Wales in 1909. The family moved to Ballarat while Louis was an infant.

Riley, a half forward flanker, spent two and a half years playing at Melbourne before crossing to Collingwood during the 1934 season. He kicked a career high 38 goals in 1935 and finished the year in a premiership team. Another premiership followed in 1936 and he remained at Collingwood for a further two seasons before retiring.

References

Holmesby, Russell and Main, Jim (2007). The Encyclopedia of AFL Footballers. 7th ed. Melbourne: Bas Publishing.

1909 births
Australian rules footballers from Victoria (Australia)
Melbourne Football Club players
Collingwood Football Club players
Collingwood Football Club Premiership players
Golden Point Football Club players
1989 deaths
Two-time VFL/AFL Premiership players